

This is a list of the National Register of Historic Places listings in Stewart County, Tennessee.

This is intended to be a complete list of the properties and districts on the National Register of Historic Places in Stewart County, Tennessee, United States.  Latitude and longitude coordinates are provided for many National Register properties and districts; these locations may be seen together in a map.

There are 16 properties and districts listed on the National Register in the county. Ten of these are the ruins of iron furnaces. In the 19th century, Stewart County was a major center for iron mining and production. Production of iron in the county began some time shortly before 1828 and continued until 1927, when the last blast furnace shut down. All of the county's iron furnaces were "stone stack" cold-blast furnaces that used charcoal obtained from burning timber from local forests.

Current listings

|}

See also

 List of National Historic Landmarks in Tennessee
 National Register of Historic Places listings in Tennessee

References

Stewart
 
Buildings and structures in Stewart County, Tennessee